Manuel Gomez (1859–1922) was a Spanish clarinettist and founding member of the London Symphony Orchestra. Gomez is believed to have been responsible for introducing the Boehm system to the United Kingdom.

References

1859 births
1922 deaths
Spanish clarinetists